Georgia Ruth Williams (born 5 January 1988) is a Welsh singer-songwriter and harpist. She sings in both English and Welsh.

Early life
Williams was born in Llantwit Major in South Wales. At the age of four she moved with her family to Aberystwyth, where she was educated bilingually in English and Welsh, though her parents were not Welsh speakers.

She began to learn the harp at the age of seven, and began to perform her own music whilst studying English Literature at the University of Cambridge. Her early recordings were sent to BBC Radio Wales's Adam Walton, and acclaim led to an early BBC Introducing appearance at the 2008 Glastonbury Festival.

Music career
Williams's first EP, In Luna, was released on limited edition 10" vinyl in 2011. It was engineered and produced by David Wrench at the Bryn Derwen Recording Studio in Snowdonia and featured Pete Richardson from Y Niwl on drums and Pete Walton on double bass.

The EP drew critical acclaim and gained radio airplay from Huw Stephens and Steve Lamacq, leading to an appearance at the 2012 Green Man Festival. She also performed at the festival in 2014 and 2015.

Her first album, Week of Pines (2013) was once again produced by David Wrench and featured Dafydd Hughes, Iwan Hughes and Aled Hughes from Cowbois Rhos Botwnnog.

Music from the album gained significant radio airplay from Adam Walton and Bethan Elfyn on BBC Radio Wales, Huw Stephens on BBC Radio 1, Steve Lamacq and Tom Robinson on BBC Radio 6 Music and Simon Raymonde on Amazing Radio. Additional live sessions were recorded on 6 Music with Lauren Laverne with interviews on BBC Radio Cymru.

The album was further promoted by live appearances at Festival N°6, BBC Introducing on BBC Radio 2 in Hyde Park, Latitude Festival and WOMEX. In 2014 she appeared in session for Bob Harris on BBC Radio 2 and a collaboration with Newport-based Ballet Cymru at the Riverfront Arts Centre, in which a live performance of tracks from the album was interpreted by the company's dancers. 

Williams made a guest appearance on "Divine Youth", from Manic Street Preachers 2014 album Futurology. She was also involved in the Ghazalaw project with Gwyneth Glyn and Tauseef Akhtar. She features on several tracks on British folk artist Jinnwoo's 2016 debut record Strangers Bring Me No Light.

Williams's second album Fossil Scale was released in October 2016.

Broadcasting
Williams provided cover for Bethan Elfyn on her BBC Radio Wales show and has also presented shows on C2.

Awards
Week of Pines was awarded the 2013 Welsh Music Prize. Williams was nominated for the Horizon Music Prize in the 2014 BBC Radio 2 Folk Awards. Her second album, Fossil Scale, was nominated for the Welsh Music Prize in 2017; the winning album, The Gentle Good's Ruins/Adfeilion, features Williams on harp and backing vocals.

Personal life
Williams is married to musician Iwan Hughes (Huws) from Cowbois Rhos Botwnnog. They share their time between Cardiff and Caernarfon. They have a son, born in 2017.

Williams supports Welsh independence. She has said: "An independent Wales is a stronger Wales. We are brave, dynamic and innovative; we contain multitudes. If we are to have agency over our own language, our creative industries and – perhaps most urgently – our own environment and climate, we must be independent."

Solo discography

EPs
 In Luna (Gwymon, 2011)

Albums
 Week of Pines (Gwymon, 2013)
 Fossil Scale (Navigator, 2016)
 Mai (Bubblewrap, 2020)

References

External links
 
 
 SoundCloud

1988 births
Living people
Welsh harpists
21st-century Welsh women singers
Welsh folk musicians
Welsh-speaking musicians